Melamera is a monotypic moth genus of the family Noctuidae. Its only species, Melamera velutina, is found in Colombia. Both the genus and species were first described by George Hampson in 1910.

References

Acontiinae
Monotypic moth genera